The General Synod of the United Church of Christ is the national decision-making body for the denomination, responsible for giving general direction to the evangelistic, missionary, and justice programs of the UCC. Because the UCC holds to an explicitly congregational polity, though, any decisions made by the Synod are not binding upon the UCC's congregations (or its associations or conferences) in any way, though the national offices and the UCC's Constitution and Bylaws expect serious consideration to be given them. The Synod is the legal successor the General Council of the Congregational Christian Churches and the General Synod (its namesake) of the Evangelical and Reformed Church. The Synod is responsible for authorizing budgets and electing board members for the "Covenanted Ministries" (formerly known as instrumentalities) of the UCC; those agencies have evolved over the years from a number of separate entities, with different organizational structures, into a more coordinated configuration in order to serve the denomination more efficiently. The home and international missions agencies in particular were the descendants of Congregationalist (originally interdenominational) boards founded in the 19th century; they were "recognized" when the UCC began during the period between 1957 and 1961. The Synod usually makes pronouncements and passes resolutions on social and political issues judged to be of concern by delegates as well; most if not all have historically reflected liberal theological and political perspectives, including support for civil rights, feminism, environmentalism, and rights for homosexuals.

Delegates
The Synod itself is composed of delegates, either clergy or lay, from the 36 conferences of the UCC, apportioned in a manner similar to states in the United States House of Representatives, with each conference assigned a minimum of three delegates regardless of its membership size as a proportion of the national membership. The national bylaws permit a minimum of 675 delegates from all conferences, but no more than 725. Others receiving vote in Synod include the denomination's officers, the corporate members of the United Church of Christ Board (formerly the Executive Council; functions as the Synod ad interim between meetings), and representatives of so-called "Historically Underrepresented Groups," such as racial minorities, the disabled, young adults, and gay and lesbian persons. Conference delegations larger than the minimum of three are required to have at least half their numbers be composed of lay people and, to the extent possible, include as many of the HUGs as previously described.

The chart below shows the moderators and assistant moderators, and the places of Synod meetings, since the United Church of Christ was founded on June 25, 1957. From that time until the 1961 General Synod, Synods had co-moderators, one each from the Congregational Christian Churches and the Evangelical and Reformed Church, since both bodies were still in existence during that period. On July 4, 1961, the UCC constitution and bylaws was declared in effect, and, until a 2013 revision, provided for a single moderator with two assistants. Beginning with the 30th Synod in 2015, moderators have had only one assistant.

Moderators and Assistant Moderators of United Church of Christ General Synods

References

Sources
Past Constitutions and Bylaws of the United Church of Christ
Current UCC Constitution and Bylaws, as adopted on July 2, 2015
General Synod Minutes

United Church of Christ
American Christian clergy